In the AFL Women's (AFLW), the Fremantle fairest and best award is awarded to the best and fairest player at the Fremantle Football Club during the home-and-away season. The award has been awarded annually since the competition's inaugural season in 2017, and Dana Hooker was the inaugural winner of the award.

Recipients

See also

 Doig Medal (list of Fremantle Football Club best and fairest winners in the Australian Football League)

References

AFL Women's awards
Lists of AFL Women's players
   
Awards established in 2017